Theresa Rebeck (born February 19, 1958) is an American playwright, television writer, and novelist. Her work has appeared on the Broadway and Off-Broadway stage, in film, and on television. Among her awards are the Mystery Writers of America's Edgar Award. In 2012, she received the Athena Film Festival Award for Excellence as a Playwright and Author of Films, Books, and Television. She is a 2009 recipient of the Alex Awards. Her works have influenced American playwrights by bringing a feminist edge in her old works.

Early life and education
Rebeck was born in Kenwood, Ohio, and graduated from Cincinnati's Ursuline Academy in 1976. She earned her undergraduate degree at the University of Notre Dame in 1980, and followed that with three degrees from Brandeis University: an MA in English 1983, a MFA in Playwriting in 1986, and a PhD in Victorian era melodrama, awarded in 1989.

Career
Past New York productions of her work include Mauritius on Broadway at the Biltmore Theatre in a Manhattan Theater Club production; The Scene, The Water's Edge, Loose Knit, The Family of Mann and Spike Heels at Second Stage Theatre; Bad Dates and The Butterfly Collection at Playwrights Horizons; and View of the Dome at New York Theatre Workshop. Omnium Gatherum (co-written, finalist for the Pulitzer Prize for Drama in 2003) was featured at the Humana Festival, and had a commercial run at the Variety Arts Theatre in 2003. Her play The Understudy, premiered at the Williamstown Theatre Festival in the summer of 2008, with a cast including Reg Rogers, Bradley Cooper and Kristen Johnson, and ran in New York at the Roundabout Theatre from October 2009 – January 2010, featuring Julie White, Justin Kirk, and Mark-Paul Gosselaar in the cast. The off-Broadway and regional theatre hit comedy premiered in 2015 at Artists Repertory Theatre in Portland. Rebeck was attached as a book writer for the new musical Ever After, based on the Drew Barrymore movie of the same name. That show was expected to start pre-Broadway tryouts in San Francisco in April 2009, but was postponed. Her play, Mauritius, ran at the Pasadena Playhouse in California from March 27 through April 26, 2009.

Her play Seminar played on Broadway starting in October 2011, and starred Alan Rickman. In May 2014 Seminar premiered in San Francisco at San Francisco Playhouse receiving outstanding reviews. Her play Fool premiered at the Alley Theatre, Houston, Texas, in February 2014. The theme of the play Seminar was women empowerment through sexuality and the struggles of what it is to be a female in an industry dominated by men.

Her play Poor Behavior opened Off-Broadway at Primary Stages in August 2014. The play premiered at the Mark Taper Forum in 2011.

In an article in The New York Times in September 2007, she said that her plays were about "betrayal and treason and poor behavior. A lot of poor behavior."
Rebeck's other publications include Free Fire Zone, a book of comedic essays about writing and show business. She has written for American Theatre magazine and has had excerpts of her plays published in the Harvard Review. Rebeck's first novel, Three Girls and Their Brother, was published in 2008 by Random House/Shaye Areheart Books.

She has received awards including the Mystery Writers of America's Edgar Award, the Writers Guild of America Award for Episodic Drama, the Hispanic Images Imagen Award, and the Peabody Award, all for her work on NYPD Blue. She has won the National Theatre Conference Award (for The Family of Mann), and was awarded the William Inge New Voices Playwriting Award in 2003 for The Bells.  Mauritius was originally produced at Boston's Huntington Theatre, where it received the 2007 IRNE Award for Best New Play as well as the Elliot Norton Award. In 2010, Rebeck was honored with the PEN/Laura Pels International Foundation for Theater Award for an American playwright in mid-career.

In television, Rebeck has written for Dream On, Brooklyn Bridge, L.A. Law, American Dreamer, Maximum Bob, First Wave, and Third Watch. She has been a writer/producer for Canterbury's Law, Smith, Law & Order: Criminal Intent and NYPD Blue. Through March 2012 she was one of the executive producers for the NBC musical series Smash, which she created, and which also debuted on February 6, 2012. Her produced feature film screenplays include Harriet the Spy, Gossip, and the independent feature Sunday on the Rocks.

Academic
Rebeck is Distinguished Professor of Playwriting and holds the Lyndall Finley Wortham Chair in the Performing Arts at the University of Houston.

Rebeck is a board member of The Dramatists Guild and the Lark Play Development Center in New York City, and has taught at Brandeis University and Columbia University. In 2014 she will join the faculty of the University of Houston School of Theatre and Dance as a distinguished visiting professor of playwriting.

Personal life
Rebeck is married, residing with her husband, Jess Lynn, and two children, Cooper and Cleo in Park Slope, Brooklyn. Three Girls and their Brother is dedicated to both Cooper and Cleo.

Works

Plays
Her other work as a playwright includes:

Full-length
 Mad House (West End, 2022)
 Bernhardt/Hamlet (Broadway, 2018)
 What We're Up Against (2017)
 Seared (2016)
 The Nest (2016)
 Dead Accounts (2012)
 Seminar (2011)
 Poor Behavior (2011)
 O Beautiful (2011), written for the professional actors at the University of Delaware
 The Understudy (2007)
 Mauritius (2007)
 Our House (2009)
 The Scene (2006)
 The Water's Edge (2006)
 The Bells (2005)
 Omnium Gatherum (2003) (co-written with Alexandra Gersten-Vassilaros)
 Bad Dates (2003)
 Dollhouse (2000)
 The Butterfly Collection (2000)
 Abstract Expression (1998)
 View of the Dome (1996)
 Sunday on the Rocks (1994, Final version – 1996)
 The Family of Mann (1994)
 Loose Knit (1992)
 Spike Heels (1990, Final version – 1992)

One Acts
 Mary, Mother of God, Intercede for Us (2006)
 Aftermath (2005)
 Off Base (2005)
 How We Get to Where We're Going (2004)
 Train to Brooklyn (2003)
 Deliver Me (2003)
 The Actress (2002)
 Art Appreciation (2002)
 Funeral Play (2001)
 Josephina (2001)
 First Day (2000)
 Walk (1999)
 Great To See You (1998)
 The Contract (1997)
 Katie and Frank (1996)
 Does This Woman Have a Name? (1993)
 What We Are Up Against (1992)
 Candy Heart (1992)
 Drinking Problem (1991)
 Big Mistake (1991)
 Sex with the Censor (1990)
 The Bar Plays (1990)

Television
For her work on NYPD Blue, Rebeck was awarded a Mystery Writers of America Edgar Award and a Writers Guild of America award for Episodic Drama.

Canterbury's Law
Smith
Law & Order: Criminal Intent
Third Watch
Maximum Bob
Total Security
American Dreamer
L.A. Law
Dream On
Brooklyn Bridge
Smash

Film
Her work as a screenwriter (or story writer) includes:
Catwoman
Gossip
Harriet the Spy
Seducing Charlie Barker
Sunday on the Rocks
Trouble (also director)
The 355

Fiction
I'm Glad About You (2016)
Twelve Rooms with a View (2011)
Three Girls and Their Brother: A Novel by Theresa Rebeck (2009)

Non-fiction
"Free Fire Zone: A Playwright's Adventures on the Creative Battlefields of Film, TV, and Theater" (2007)

Bibliography

References

External links

Who's Who entry from Playbill
Channeling Theatre: A Chat with Theresa Rebeck, a January 2004 Playbill article
Her Notre Dame study theatre work in the late 1970s, from the university's website
Theresa Rebeck at Random House
Theresa Rebeck: "I Am a Populist", an L Magazine article from December 11, 2009

1958 births
Living people
21st-century American novelists
20th-century American dramatists and playwrights
Screenwriters from Ohio
Television producers from Ohio
American women television producers
American television writers
American women novelists
Brandeis University alumni
Edgar Award winners
University of Notre Dame alumni
Writers from Cincinnati
Roman Catholic writers
American women dramatists and playwrights
American women screenwriters
American women television writers
People from Hamilton County, Ohio
Writers Guild of America Award winners
21st-century American women writers
20th-century American women writers
Novelists from Ohio
20th-century American screenwriters
21st-century American screenwriters